Sidney Emmanuel Wharton (19 December 1875 – 5 January 1951) was an English professional footballer who played for Small Heath as a winger. He was a pacy winger with good ball-control who created chances and was always involved in the game. He made 167 appearances in all competitions for Small Heath. In 1900–01 he played for the Football League XI against the Irish League and was a member of  an England XI in an unofficial international against a German XI, alongside clubmate Alex Leake.

In the 1901 Census, Wharton was listed as a professional footballer living in Dawson Street, Smethwick, Staffordshire. He later became a bookmaker, and is listed in that occupation on the 1939 Register. He died in Birmingham in January 1951 at the age of 75.

He was the uncle of racing car driver Ken Wharton.

Honours
Small Heath
 Football League Second Division runners up: 1900–01, 1902–03

References

1875 births
1951 deaths
Footballers from Birmingham, West Midlands
English footballers
Association football wingers
Birmingham City F.C. players
English Football League players
English Football League representative players